Torpedo is a genus of rays, commonly known as electric rays, torpedo rays, or torpedoes. They are slow-moving bottom-dwellers capable of generating electricity as a defense and feeding mechanism.

The naval weapon known as the torpedo was named after this genus, whose own name is derived from the Latin word  meaning 'numb' or 'paralysed', presumably the sensation one would feel after experiencing the ray's electric shock.

Electricity
Electric rays have patches of modified muscle cells called electroplaques that make up an electric organ. These generate an electric gradient, similar to the normal electric potential across most cell membranes, but amplified greatly by its concentration into a very small area. The electricity can be stored in the tissues, which act as a battery. The battery can be discharged in pulses. A ray can emit a shock into the body of a prey animal to stun it and make it easier to capture and eat, or into the body of a predator.

Use in neurobiological research
The torpedo electric organ, being composed of modified muscle cells, has proven highly useful in the neurobiological study of the neuromuscular junction. For example, agrin was first isolated from Torpedo.

Ancient remedy
Scribonius Largus, a first century physician, advised the use of a live torpedo as a headache remedy. He stated, "Headache even if it is chronic and unbearable is taken away and remedied forever by a live torpedo placed under the spot that is in pain."

Description
Torpedo rays are flat like other rays, disc-shaped, with caudal fins that vary in length. Their mouths and gill slits are located on their undersides. Males have claspers near the base of the tail. Females are ovoviviparous, meaning they form eggs but do not lay them. The young "hatch" within her body and she bears them live.

Species
There are currently 13 recognized species in this genus:
 Torpedo adenensis M. R. de Carvalho, Stehmann & Manilo, 2002 (Aden Gulf torpedo)
 Torpedo alexandrinsis Mazhar, 1987 (Alexandrine torpedo)
 Torpedo andersoni Bullis, 1962 (Florida torpedo)
 Torpedo bauchotae Cadenat, Capapé & Desoutter, 1978 (Rosette torpedo)
 Torpedo fuscomaculata W. K. H. Peters, 1855 (Black-spotted torpedo)
 Torpedo mackayana Metzelaar, 1919 (Ringed torpedo)
 Torpedo marmorata A. Risso, 1810 (Marbled electric ray)
 Torpedo microdiscus Parin & Kotlyar, 1985 (Smalldisk torpedo)
 Torpedo panthera Olfers, 1831 (Leopard torpedo)
 Torpedo semipelagica Parin & Kotlyar, 1985 (Semipelagic torpedo)
 Torpedo sinuspersici Olfers, 1831 (Variable torpedo or Gulf torpedo)
 Torpedo suessii Steindachner, 1898
 Torpedo torpedo (Linnaeus, 1758) (Common torpedo)

Two fossil species, T. acarinata Adnet, 2006 and T. pessanti Adnet, 2006, are known from the Eocene of southwestern France.

References

 
Ray genera
Taxa named by Martinus Houttuyn